Andras Jones (born August 12, 1968) is an American television and film actor, author, and musician. He has participated in the bands The Previous and Mr. Jones and The Previous, as well as under his own name. Jones is the creator and host of Radio8Ball, a musical divination show in which participants' questions are answered by picking songs at random and interpreting the randomly chosen songs as the answer to the question. In 1989 Jones was nominated for a Young Artist Award for Best Young Actor in a Horror or Mystery Motion Picture for his role in A Nightmare on Elm Street 4, but lost to Lukas Haas's performance in Lady in White.

Jones is the author of Accidental Initiations: In The Kabbalistic Tree Of Olympia and contributed a chapter to The Sync Book - Volume 1, both for Sync Book Press.

His maternal grandfather was electrical engineer Louis Smullin.

Filmography

Films
 1988 Sorority Babes in the Slimeball Bowl-O-Rama as Calvin
 1988 A Nightmare on Elm Street 4: The Dream Master as Rick Johnson
 1989 Far From Home as Jimmy Reed
 1990 Tripwire as Rick DeForest
 1992 The Prom as Marty
 1992 Averills Ankommon as Averill
 1994 Every Breath as Good Looking Man
 1995 The Demolitionist as Daniel Dupre
 1997 Hurricane Festival as Nick The Magician
 2001 The Attic Expeditions as Trevor Blackburn
 2011 Every Day Is a Journey as Anthony "Antonious" Scrotner

Television
 1989 Good Morning, Miss Bliss (1 episode) as Deke Simmons
 1990 Alien Nation (1 episode) as Noah Ramsey

Video games
 1992 Night Trap as Jeff Martin

Discography

As Andras Jones 
Albums
A Curmudgeon For All Seasons (2000)
All You Get (2019)

EPs
Cold '98 (1998)
Religious '99 (2000)
Complicated '00 (2001)

With The Previous 
Albums
The Wrong Side Of Town (1989)
Porch Music (1990)
UnPop… (1997)

Singles
"Fast Forvard" (2017)

With the Boon
The Boon (1988)

Other albums 
 Mr. Jones & The Hard Feelings (1995)
 Mr. Jones & the Fascists: In Search of the Hundredth Monkey (1992)
 The Transfused (2000)
 Andy Shmushkin: Total F**cking Bullsh*t (2003)
 Andy Dick: The Darkest Day of The Year (2009)

References

External links 

 
 

1968 births
20th-century American male actors
21st-century American male actors
American male film actors
American male television actors
American male songwriters
Male actors from California
Musicians from California
Living people
Songwriters from California